Lawapa or Lavapa was a figure in Tibetan Buddhism who flourished in the 10th century. He was also known as Kambala and Kambalapada. Lawapa, was a mahasiddha, or accomplished yogi, who travelled to Tsari. Lawapa was a progenitor of the Dream Yoga sādhanā and it was from Lawapa that the mahasiddha Tilopa received the Dream Yoga practice lineage.

Bhattacharya, while discussing ancient Bengali literature, proffers that Lawapa composed the Kambalagītika ( "Lawapa's Song") and a few songs of realization in the Charyapada.

Simmer-Brown (2001: p. 57) when conveying the ambiguity of ḍākinīs in their "worldly" and "wisdom" guises conveys a detailed narrative that provides the origin of Lawapa's name:

Nomenclature, orthography and etymology
Alternate English orthographies are Lwabapa, Lawapa and Lvapa.
 An alternate English nomenclature for Lawapa is Kambala.

Hevajra
The Hevajra Tantra, a yoginītantra of the anuttarayogatantra class, is held to have originated between the late eighth century C.E. (Snellgrove), and the "late ninth or early tenth century" (Davidson), in Eastern India, possibly Bengal.  Tāranātha lists Saroruha and Kampala (also known as "Lva-va-pā, "Kambhalī", and "Śrī-prabhada") as its "bringers":  
... the foremost yogi Virūpā meditated on the path of Yamāri and attained siddhi under the blessings of Vajravārāhi,...His disciple Dombi Heruka...understood the essence of the Hevajra Tantra, and composed many śāstras like the Nairātmā-devi-sādhana and the Sahaja-siddhi. He also conferred abhiṣeka on his own disciples. After this, two ācāryas Lva-va-pā and Saroruha brought the Hevajra Tantra. ... Siddha Sarouha was the first to bring the Hevajra-pitṛ-sādhana.

Principal teachers
The Tibetan Buddhism Resource Center (2006) identifies three principal teachers of Lawapa: 
 Anangavajra (Sanskrit; Tibetan: yan lag med pa'i rdo rje)
 (Tibetan: Deng ki pa)
 Vajravarahi (Yeshe Tshogyal) (Sanskrit; Tibetan: rdo rje phag mo).

Principal students
The Tibetan Buddhism Resource Center  (2006) identifies two principal students of Lawapa: 
 (Tibetan: nag po spyod pa)
 (Tibetan: indra bhu ti).

See also
Charyapada
Trance
Bardo
Padmasambhava
Six Yogas

Notes

Further reading
Dudjom Rinpoche and Jikdrel Yeshe Dorje. The Nyingma School of Tibetan Buddhism: its Fundamentals and History. Two Volumes. 1991. Translated and edited by Gyurme Dorje with Matthew Kapstein. Wisdom Publications, Boston. 
Dargyay, Eva M. (author) & Wayman, Alex (editor)(1998). The Rise of Esoteric Buddhism in Tibet. Second revised edition, reprint.Delhi, India: Motilal Banarsidass Publishers Pvt Ltd. Buddhist Tradition Series Vol.32.  (paper)

Lamas
Scholars of Buddhism from Tibet
Nyingma Buddhists
Tibetan Buddhist yogis
10th-century people
Mahasiddhas
Ascetics
Tantra
Spiritual practice
Vajrayana
Year of death unknown
Place of death unknown
Indian Buddhists
Buddhist yogis
10th-century Indian poets
10th-century Tibetan people
Indian male poets